In organic chemistry, a nitrate ester is an organic functional group with the formula , where R stands for any organyl group.  They are the esters of nitric acid and alcohols. A well-known example is nitroglycerin, which is not a nitro compound, despite its name.

Synthesis and reactions
Nitrate esters are typically prepared by condensation of nitric acid and the alcohol:  For example, the simplest nitrate ester, methyl nitrate, is formed by reaction of methanol and nitric acid in the presence of sulfuric acid:
CH3OH  +  HNO3 -> CH3ONO2  +  H2O
This condensation is sometimes called "nitroxylation".

Explosive properties
The thermal decomposition of nitrate esters mainly yields the gases molecular nitrogen (N2) and carbon dioxide. The considerable chemical energy of the detonation is due to the high strength of the bond in molecular nitrogen.  This stoichiometry is illustrated by the equation for the detonation of nitroglycerin.

Illustrative of the highly sensitive nature of some organic nitrates is Si(CH2ONO2)4. A single crystal of this compound detonates even upon contact with a teflon spatula and in fact made full characterization impossible. Another contributor to its exothermic decomposition (inferred from much safer in silico experimentation) is the ability of silicon in its crystal phase to coordinate to two oxygen nitrito groups in addition to regular coordination to the four carbon atoms. This additional coordination would make formation of silicon dioxide (one of the decomposition products) more facile.

Medical use 

The nitrate esters isosorbide dinitrate (Isordil) and isosorbide mononitrate (Imdur, Ismo, Monoket, Mononitron) are converted in the body to nitric oxide, a potent natural vasodilator. In medicine, these esters are used as a medicine for angina pectoris (ischemic heart disease).

Related compounds
Acetyl nitrate is a nitrate anhydride, being derived from the condensation of nitric and acetic acids.

References

Functional groups